Penuel (or Pniel, Pnuel; Hebrew:  Pənūʾēl) is a place described in the Hebrew Bible as being not far from Succoth, on the east of the Jordan River and south of the river Jabbok in present-day Jordan.

Penuel is mentioned in the Book of Genesis as the site of Jacob's struggle with the angel. In 1 Kings, it is mentioned as a capital for Jeroboam, first king of the northern Kingdom of Israel, which he fortified.

Biblical narrative 
According to the Biblical narrative, the site was named Peniel ("Face of God") by Jacob:

Here Jacob wrestled (Gen. 32:24–32) "with a man" ("the angel", Hos. 12:4) "till the break of day." This episode resulted in God (or the angel) changing Jacob's name to "Israel" (Gen. 32:28) which literally means, "he who strives with God" or "God strives".

Penuel is later mentioned in the Book of Judges. The men of this place refused to give bread to Gideon and his three hundred men when they were in pursuit of the Midianites. On his return, Gideon tore down the tower there and killed all the men of the city.

According to the Jewish Bible, king Jeroboam of Israel established his capital in Shechem. A short time later, he left Shechem and fortified Penuel, declaring it as his new capital. He and his son, Nadab, ruled there, until Baasha seized the throne in 909 BCE and moved the capital to Tirzah. In the scriptures, it is identified as both an El-site and a Jahwist site. 

‘Pnuel’ is also a common name given to males in Assyrian culture.

Some scholars consider that the material of Genesis 32–35, including the account of Jacob being renamed Israel at Penuel, may be a later addition that introduces a new power structure centered around the establishment of sacral places in the North (Penuel, Shechem and Bethel).

Identification 
Up until 1970, biblical scholars identified Penuel with the twin peaks of Tulul adh-Dhahab in modern-day Jordan. Based on the account given in Genesis, scholars believed Penuel to be the location of a sacred sanctuary, and presumed that there must have been a temple from Iron Age I or earlier on one of the peaks. Since such a structure has not been found, this identification was questioned.

Contemporary Israeli archaeologist Israel Finkelstein suggested to see the twin peaks as two distinct sites that probably featured distinct names during antiquity. He suggested identifying the western, larger, hill (Tell edh-Dhahab al-Gharbi) with Mahanaim and the eastern one (Tell edh-Dhahab esh-Sharqi) with Penuel.

See also
Vayishlach, the Torah reading describing the events at Penuel.

References

Torah places
Jacob
Book of Genesis
Kingdom of Israel (Samaria)